PVR may refer to:
Poly Vinyl Rubber
 Penn Virginia Resources, a mining company
 Personal video recorder
 Plant variety rights, granted to a plant breeder
 Polio Virus Receptor (CD155), a human protein
 Proliferative vitreoretinopathy, an eye disease
 Pulmonary vascular resistance
 PVR Cinemas, India
  Licenciado Gustavo Díaz Ordaz International Airport, Puerto Vallarta, Jalisco, Mexico, IATA code